The Yamaha YZF600R (Thundercat in European markets) is a  sports bike made by Yamaha from 1996 to 2007.

Overview
The YZF600R Thundercat was introduced to Europe in 1996 as a replacement to the FZR600R. During the 1997 European 600 super sport championship season, the YZF600R Thundercat was the only four-cylinder motorcycle to win a race against the dominant Ducati 748.

It retained major mechanical components such as the engine, transmission, suspension components, and steel Deltabox frame.

In 1998 Sport Rider magazine said the YZF600R is "More fun on the racetrack than we ever dreamed, brakes that embarrassed the rest of the field. Consensus: Best middleweight street bike on the planet."

Motor Cycle News describes the YZF600R as more suited to sport touring than aggressive sport or road racing., while the fully adjustable Kayaba suspension and Sumitomo "Blue Spot" mono-block calipers, later used on the R1, R6 and other models, also make it a good choice for track racing.

Yamaha sold the YZF600R Thundercat in Europe from 1996-2003, and in the United States and Canada until 2008, with little more than periodic aesthetic changes after 1997 when the exhaust system and wiring loom were updated.

References

YZF600R
Sport bikes
Motorcycles introduced in 1994